Bridgeport (also: Nyes Landing and Nye's Crossing) is a former settlement on the Yuba River in Nevada County, California,  from the town of French Corral.

It is notable for the Bridgeport Covered Bridge, a national and state historic landmark, used as a pedestrian crossing over the South Yuba River.
The South Yuba River State Park is adjacent.

History
In 1849, as part of the California Gold Rush, brothers Urias and Manual Nye built a trading post on the site.

See also

References

Former settlements in Nevada County, California
Mining communities of the California Gold Rush
Yuba River
Populated places established in 1849
1849 establishments in California
Former populated places in California